Kyan may refer to Kyan White

Places 
 Kyan, Lahe, Burma
 Kraburi River

Other uses
 Kyan (name)
 KYAN-LD, a defunct low-power television station (channel 2, virtual 43) formerly licensed to serve Los Angeles, California, United States